Sevenhampton is a small village in the borough of Swindon, in the ceremonial county of Wiltshire, England.

In 1212 the toponym was recorded as Suvenhantone, meaning "town of the dwellers at a place called 'seven wells' or the like". The parish church is surrounded by earthworks marking the site of a medieval settlement, possibly including an earlier church. The site is a scheduled ancient monument.

The Church of England parish church of St James (also recorded as St Andrew) was built in 1846 by W. Pedley, in the Early English style. Its churchyard has the grave of Ian Fleming, the creator of the James Bond series of novels.

Sevenhampton House, near the church, is from the 17th century.

Warnford Place is a country house, southeast of the church, with grounds overlooking the River Cole. One wing of an 18th-century house survives, following remodelling by Lord Banbury in 1904. The house, then known as Sevenhampton Place, was owned by Ian Fleming and his wife Ann from 1960 until her death in 1981.

Central Hall Cricket Club is based in the village.

Maranatha Christian School, a private school, is near Sevenhampton.

See also
Samuel Wilson Warneford, philanthropist

References

External links

Villages in Wiltshire